A transcontinental walk involves crossing a continent on foot.  If a walk does not technically cross the entire continent, but starts and ends in a major city right near two opposing sides of a continent, it is usually considered transcontinental. People have crossed continents walking alone or in groups.

Purpose
Some people have completed a transcontinental walk due to a whim or a bet.  Others have attempted transcontinental expeditions for scientific study or exploration. Transcontinental marches have been organized to serve as a demonstration to attract interest in some topic, or raise funds for a cause.

Challenges
Depending on the continent to be crossed, different challenges arise. To cross Antarctica on foot, supplying provisions would have to be well-planned.  Crossing any continent on foot is also a test of endurance and physical condition. People who do a crossing without support have to transport equipment, tent, food etc., on a carriage or sled. That is an extra challenge, compared to those who have car support.

Group transcontinental walks can be tougher to organize logistically than solo or duo efforts, especially when crossing international borders, since there generally needs to be greater accommodations and more thorough approvals for a group. There is also a tougher process of decision making with even a small group than with one or two people. People walking in groups sometimes say that the walking part is easier than dealing with group politics and dynamics. One participant in the Great Peace March for Global Nuclear Disarmament, a transcontinental group march of about 500 people in 1986, said, “We can’t agree on anything except to knock at the Porta-Potty.”

North America

Charles Fletcher Lummis
In 1884, Charles Fletcher Lummis was working for a newspaper in Cincinnati when he was offered a job with the Los Angeles Times. Lummis decided to make the 3,500-mile journey from Cincinnati to Los Angeles on foot. He chronicled the 143 days of his journey, sending weekly dispatches to the newspaper. In spite of a broken arm and heavy snows in New Mexico, he finished the trip, and in 1892, his writings of the journey were published as a book, A Tramp Across the Continent.

John Hugh Gillis
In 1906, on a bet and a dare, John Hugh Gillis walked from North Sydney, Nova Scotia to Vancouver, British Columbia.  He was the first person to cross Canada on foot.

Great Peace March for Global Nuclear Disarmament
In 1986, hundreds of people walked from Los Angeles to Washington DC in what is referred to as the Great Peace March for Global Nuclear Disarmament.  The march took nine months to traverse , advancing approximately fifteen miles per day.

A Walk of the People – A Pilgrimage for Life
A Walk of the People – A Pilgrimage for Life called for an end to the Cold War with better relations between the U.S. and former Soviet Union. Walkers started at Point Conception, Calif., in 1984 and went through Texas and the Deep South to New York City. A core group of eight flew to Dublin, Ireland, in 1985 and walked to the border of the former East Germany. They obtained visas to Hungary and walked to that border before visiting several cities by train. Some walked to Geneva, Switzerland, then organized a trip to Moscow, Russia, by train.

Australia

Australia has been host to a number of people who have walked across the country, who have completed the walk as either a personal challenge or to raise funds and awareness for charity.

Antarctica

Imperial Trans-Antarctic Expedition
The Imperial Trans-Antarctic Expedition was an attempt from 1914 to 1917, to march across Antarctica, and was the last major expedition of the Heroic Age of Antarctic Exploration.

Europe

Trans-Europe Foot Race
In the Trans-Europe Foot Race, participants cross Europe on foot, although they are mainly running, not walking. It is a multiday race, and in 2003 crossed about 3,200 miles in Europe from Lisbon to Moscow. There were 21 finishers, not counting a wheelchair user. In 2009, it crossed Europe from Bari, Italy, to North Cape, Norway, in 64 days. It had 45 finishers. The participants have support with food, beverages and accommodation. There was also a race in 2012, and another is planned for 2021.

References

Further reading 
 
Worsley, Frank A.: Endurance: An Epic of Polar Adventure W.W. Norton & Company, 1999 

Walking
Hiking
Travel
Physical fitness
Adventure